USS Prince Georges (AP-165/AK-224) was a  in the service of the US Navy in World War II. Named after the Prince George's County, Maryland, it was the only ship of the Navy to bear this name.

Construction
Prince Georges was laid down on 20 September 1942, as liberty ship SS Richard March Hoe, MCE hull 426, by Permanente Metals Corporation, Yard No. 2, Richmond, California, under a Maritime Commission (MARCOM) contract; launched on 30 October 1942, sponsored by Mrs. Patricia Montgomery; served the Army Transport Service (ATS) making runs to the Aleutian Islands with Army troops; acquired by the Navy under bareboat charter on 25 October 1943; and commissioned on 10 November 1943.

Service history
On 16 December, Prince Georges departed Pearl Harbor on her first Navy operation, which took her to the bloody shores of Tarawa, where she spent Christmas 1943, and New Year's Day of 1944, before returning to Pearl Harbor. In February, she steamed from Pearl Harbor to disgorge men and material on Kwajalein Atoll, Makin Island and Abamama, Kiribati. After a return to Pearl Harbor, Prince Georges was back in the Gilberts and Marshalls in April. She participated, as part of TF 51, in her only invasion — Saipan, 20 to 25 June, returning to Pearl Harbor in July.

Reclassified AK–224, on 20 August 1944, Prince Georges departed Pearl Harbor again in early September, to back up the invasion of the Palaus, anchoring in Kossol Roads on 31 October. In December she delivered troops to Nouméa, then put into Auckland before heading north and west reaching the Solomons and Marianas in January 1945. She was employed as a troop carrier in the Central Pacific until June.

Returning to Pearl Harbor in June, she proceeded on to San Francisco. The end of the war found her back in Hawaii, whence she carried occupation troops to Saipan and Japan. Then reporting for "Magic-Carpet" duty, at the end of October, she steamed for the United States with a load of returning  soon-to-be veterans, arriving Seattle on 10 November. She then proceeded to Okinawa on another "Magic-Carpet" run.

Post-war decommissioning 
Reaching San Francisco on 13 February 1946, she decommissioned and was returned simultaneously to the War Shipping Administration (WSA) on 12 April 1946 and was placed in the National Defense Reserve Fleet at Suisun Bay, California. Her name was struck from the Navy List on 1 May 1946.

Richard March Hoe was sold for scrapping on 21 May 1969, to United Minerals & Alloys Corporation, for $43,260.54. She was delivered 10 November 1969.

Awards
Prince Georges received one battle star for World War II service.

Notes 

Citations

Bibliography 

Online resources

External links
 

Crater-class cargo ships
Transports of the United States Navy
World War II auxiliary ships of the United States
Prince George's County, Maryland
Ships built in Richmond, California
1942 ships
Suisun Bay Reserve Fleet